GFZ may refer to:

Gastre Fault Zone, a geological region of Chile
GFZ German Research Centre for Geosciences, commonly referred to as "GFZ"